is a former Japanese football player.

Playing career
Namba was born in Okayama Prefecture on December 9, 1982. After graduating from high school, he joined J1 League club Vissel Kobe in 2001. However he could not play at all in the match. In 2002, he moved to Japan Football League club Tochigi SC. Although he played many matches in 2002 season, he left the club and went on to Ryutsu Keizai University in 2003. In 2006, he joined J2 League club Yokohama FC. On September 27, he debuted in J.League as substitute forward against Vegalta Sendai and scored a goal this match.

Although he could only play this match in 2006 season, Yokohama FC won the champions and was promoted to J1 first time in the club history. In 2007, although he played many matches from opening the season, he could hardly play in the match from summer. Yokohama FC also finished at the bottom place and was relegated to J2 in a year. From 2008, he became a regular player and played many matches until 2011. However he could not play many matches in 2012. In 2013, he moved to Mito HollyHock and played many matches. In 2014, he moved to FC Gifu. Although the club results were bad, he played many matches as forward for long time. He retired end of 2018 season.

Club statistics
Updated to 19 February 2019.

References

External links

1982 births
Living people
Ryutsu Keizai University alumni
Association football people from Okayama Prefecture
Japanese footballers
J1 League players
J2 League players
Japan Football League players
Vissel Kobe players
Tochigi SC players
Yokohama FC players
Mito HollyHock players
FC Gifu players
Association football forwards